Hemifridericia is a genus of annelids belonging to the family Enchytraeidae.

The species of this genus are found in Eurasia and Northern America.

Species:
 Hemifridericia bivesiculata Christensen & Dózsa-Farkas, 2006
 Hemifridericia parva Nielsen & Christensen, 1959

References

Annelids